Anabel Medina Garrigues and Yaroslava Shvedova were the defending champions and successfully defended their title, defeating Francesca Schiavone and Silvia Soler Espinosa in the final, 7–6(7–1), 2–6, [10–3].

Seeds

  Vania King /  Barbora Záhlavová-Strýcová (semifinals)
  Monica Niculescu /  Klára Zakopalová (withdrew)
  Anabel Medina Garrigues /  Yaroslava Shvedova (champions)
  Darija Jurak /  Andreja Klepač (first round)

Draw

Draw

References 
 Main Draw

Brasil Tennis Cup - Doubles
2014 Doubles